Gregaripus is an ichnogenus of dinosaur footprint. It is possibly synonymous with Anomoepus, and may represent underprints that are instead referable to this ichnogenus.

See also

 List of dinosaur ichnogenera

References

Dinosaur trace fossils
Ornithischians